The northern whitefin gudgeon (Romanogobio belingi) is a species of freshwater fish in the family Cyprinidae. It is distributed in the northern Black Sea basin (Dniester, Southern Bug, and Dnieper riverine systems), southern Baltic Sea basin (Oder, Vistula), southern North Sea basin (Elbe, Rhine). Also, reports from lakes Ilmen and Ladoga and its basins have been made, which are questionable. Their maximal length is 11.5 cm, with a maximal reported age of 5 years.

Named in honor of Demeter (Dimitry) E. Beling, Director of the Dnieper Biological Station, authority on Ukrainian fishes frequently cited in Slastenenko’s paper.

References

Further reading
 

Romanogobio
Freshwater fish of Europe
Fish described in 1934